Sex Objects is the third full-length studio album by The Briefs, released in 2004 on CD, and yellow and black vinyl. It was released in France with an additional, unnamed track, and on yellow wax records.

Track listing
Orange Alert
Halfsize Girl
Destroy The USA
Ephedrine Blue
So Stupid
Sex Objects
Killed By Ants
No More Presidents
Shoplifting At Macys
Mystery Pill
Sally I Can't Go To The Beach
Anti-Social
Vitamin Bomb
Life Styles Of The Truly Lazy

2004 albums
The Briefs albums
BYO Records albums